The Lost People is a 1949 British drama film directed by Muriel Box and Bernard Knowles and starring Dennis Price, Mai Zetterling and Richard Attenborough. It is based on the play Cockpit by Bridget Boland. It was shot partly at Denham Studios outside London with sets designed by the art directors John Elphick and George Provis. The film's costumes were designed by Julie Harris.

Plot
After the Second World War, some British soldiers are guarding a theatre in Germany containing various refugees and prisoners trying to work out what to do with them. However, the displaced people, after uniting against fascism for five years, begin to disintegrate into their own ancient feuds: Serb against Croat, Pole against Russian, resistance fighter against collaborator and everyone against the Jews. Two people, Jan and Lily, begin a romance and decide to wed. However, one of the refugees is diagnosed with bubonic plague.

Cast

Production
Associate producer Alfred Roome called the film "terrible... we shot for ages, then it stopped and started again and got terribly boring... it actually had two or three directors who came and went."

References

Bibliography
 McFarlane, Brian . Four from the forties: Arliss, Crabtree, Knowles and Huntington. Manchester University Press, 2018.

External links

1949 films
1949 drama films
Films directed by Muriel Box
British drama films
Films set in Germany
Films set in a theatre
British black-and-white films
British films based on plays
Films shot at Station Road Studios, Elstree
Films shot at Denham Film Studios
1940s English-language films
1940s British films
Gainsborough Pictures films